Arthur Roche (born 6 March 1950) is an English cardinal of the Catholic Church who has served as prefect of the Congregation for Divine Worship since 2021. He previously served as secretary of the congregation from 2012 to 2021.

Prior to his service in the Roman Curia, Roche was Bishop of Leeds from 2004 to 2012. He served as coadjutor bishop of Leeds under Bishop David Konstant (2002-2004), and before that as an auxiliary bishop of the Archdiocese of Westminster (2001–2002). He was appointed an archbishop when he joined the Roman Curia in 2012.

On 27 August 2022, Pope Francis elevated him to the College of Cardinals.

Early life and ministry
Arthur Roche was born in Batley Carr, in the West Riding of Yorkshire, England, to Arthur and Frances Roche.  He attended St Joseph's Primary School, St John Fisher High School and Christleton Hall. From 1969 to 1975, he studied at St Alban's College in Valladolid, Spain, where he obtained a degree in theology from the Comillas Pontifical University. Upon his return to England, he was ordained to the priesthood by Bishop William Wheeler for the Catholic Diocese of Leeds on 19 July 1975.

Roche's first appointment in the diocese was as assistant priest at Holy Rood Church in Barnsley until 1978, when he became private secretary to Bishop William Gordon Wheeler. He was appointed Vice-Chancellor of the diocese in 1979. From 1982 to 1989, he served on the staff of St Anne's Cathedral in Leeds, and helped to organise the visit of Pope John Paul II to York in May 1982.

Roche was the diocesan Financial Secretary from 1986 to 1991 and parish priest at St Wilfrid's Church from 1989 to 1991. In 1991, he studied at the Pontifical Gregorian University, earning a Licence in Theology (STL). He then became spiritual director of the Venerable English College. He was appointed General Secretary of the Catholic Bishops' Conference of England and Wales in April 1996 and given the title of Monsignor.

Auxiliary bishop of Westminster
On 12 April 2001, Pope John Paul II named Roche an auxiliary bishop of Westminster and titular bishop of Rusticiana. He received his episcopal consecration on the following 10 May in Westminster Cathedral from Cardinal Cormac Murphy-O'Connor, with Bishops David Konstant and Victor Guazzelli serving as co-consecrators.

Coadjutor and Bishop of Leeds
Roche was named Coadjutor to the Bishop of Leeds, David Konstant, on 16 July 2002. Roche became the ninth bishop of Leeds when Pope John Paul accepted Bishop Konstant's resignation on health grounds on 7 April 2004.

In the Leeds diocese, in 2008 Roche's plans to close seven parishes produced vigorous protests, especially on the part of a parish in Allerton Bywater that offers Mass in Latin.

Roche had been mentioned as a possible successor to Cardinal Murphy-O'Connor as Archbishop of Westminster, head of the Catholic Church in England and Wales. He was even said to be the cardinal's favoured candidate. His name had also been mentioned as a possible successor to Archbishop Kevin McDonald as Archbishop of Southwark. Whilst Bishop of Leeds, he was appointed a Patron of the Newman Society in Oxford.

Commission on English in the Liturgy
In July 2002, while continuing as bishop of Leeds, Roche was elected chairman of the International Commission on English in the Liturgy, which oversees the translation of the Latin liturgical texts into English. The Commission had failed to win the Holy See's confirmation of its 1998 translation of the Missal, and Roche's appointment, along with replacement of staff, was part of an overhaul to ensure a more accurate translation that an increasing number of bishops and Vatican officials had wanted over the years.

As the chairman of the International Commission on English in the Liturgy, it fell to Roche to superintend the final stages of the work and then to announce that the new translation of the Missal into English was ready. There followed a positive outcome of voting on the text by all English-speaking episcopal conferences throughout the world. This new translation of the Roman Missal was introduced into Catholic parishes in the United Kingdom in September 2011.

Dicastery for Divine Worship 
On 26 June 2012, Pope Benedict XVI appointed Roche Secretary of the Congregation for Divine Worship and the Discipline of the Sacraments (CDW) and raised him to the rank of archbishop. As Secretary, he maintained the low profile typical of his curial rank, signing statements and doing press relations in tandem with the prefect of the CDW, until 2014 Cardinal Antonio Cañizares Llovera and from 2014 to 2021 Cardinal Robert Sarah. In 2016 he explained Pope Francis' decision to allow the Holy Thursday footwashing ceremony to include women. He described it as a return to practices before Pope Pius XII reorganized Holy Week services in 1955. He contradicted press reports that Cardinal Sarah was at odds with the pope on this change. He said, "I'm not aware of that, and I'm [Sarah's] closest collaborator."

Pope Francis asked him in December 2016 to chair an informal commission to determine who should have responsibility for translating liturgical texts into the vernacular. In September 2017, when Francis released his document Magnum principium giving national bishops' conferences the dominant role and constraining the authority of the CDW, Roche alone authored the CDW's accompanying commentary.

On 29 March 2014, Pope Francis named Roche a member of the Pontifical Council for Culture. On 29 July 2019, Pope Francis named him a member of the group that reviews appeals of convictions for delicta graviora, the gravest crimes dealt with by the Congregation for the Doctrine of the Faith.

On 27 May 2021, Pope Francis named him Prefect of the CDW. With this appointment Roche became the highest-ranking English cleric in the Vatican. On 13 July 2022, Pope Francis named him a member of the Dicastery for Bishops. On 27 August 2022 Pope Francis created him a Cardinal Deacon, assigned San Saba as his deaconry.

Traditionis Custodes and restrictions on the Missal of 1962
A few months into Roche's tenure as prefect, Pope Francis issued the motu propio, Traditionis Custodes, which severely restricted the celebration of Mass according to the Missal of 1962, more commonly known as the Traditional Latin Mass. Roche and his congregation were tasked with implementing the Motu Propio. On 18 December 2021, Roche issued a Responsa ad Dubia concerning Traditionis Custodes. In this document restrictions were clarified, including restrictions on the celebration of sacraments according to the old rite and a total ban on the celebration of the sacraments of Holy Orders and Confirmation according to the old rite. Roche has also stated that the promotion of the Traditional Latin Mass has been "curtailed" and that the permission to celebrate the old rite is a concession being made to those who are attached to the old rite but is not an opportunity for the old rite to be promoted.

Criticism over the suppression of the Traditional Latin Mass
Roche has come under criticism from numerous groups for his role in the implementation of Traditionis Custodes, with some claiming the steps that are being taken by Roche are "cruel", "unnecessarily harsh" or even unlawful. Despite extensive criticism by canon lawyers, Roche has rejected claims that the restrictions being implemented are unlawful, stating in an interview that the restrictions are "legitimate and fully compliant with Canon Law." Despite this, Roche later implicitly conceded that his earlier actions had been illicit by asking Pope Francis to change canon law to give the Dicastery for Divine Worship the authority he had previously tried to claim it had.  By doing so, Cardinal Roche added authorizing the traditional Latin mass in parishes to a very small list of decisions previously reserved to the Holy See and thereby significantly undermined the ecclesiology of Vatican II. In a letter to Cardinal Vincent Nichols, the Archbishop of Westminster, Roche claimed that Pope Paul VI had "abrogated" the Old Rite. Roche's assessment seemed to contradict Pope Benedict XVI's assertion in his 2007 Motu Propio, Summorum Pontificum, that the Old Rite had never been abrogated. Some have claimed that Roche has contradicted himself during the process of implementing restrictions on the Old Rite, given that in 2015 when speaking about why the celebration of the Tridentine Mass was permitted, he stated "we want unity in the Church and not just simple uniformity, Pope Francis wants unity with diversity". In January 2022, in an interview with Catholic News Service, Roche stated that if the faithful do not take Traditionis Custodes seriously, then that is "a serious decision people are making". Roche also stated in the interview that the path Pope Francis has chosen to take on the matter of the celebration of the old rite is something that he has been mandated to do by the Second Vatican Council. In the same interview Roche, also indicated that the promulgation of Traditionis Custodes was done, because it was clear that the Old Rite was being promoted rather than just being seen as a concession and according to Roch the allowance of the Old Rite was simply a concession and caring for those attached to it. However, this contradicts the aims expressed in the instruction Universae Ecclesiae which articulates the first aim of Summorum Pontificum as "offering to all the faithful the Roman Liturgy in the Usus Antiquior, considered as a precious treasure to be preserved."

See also
 Cardinals created by Pope Francis

Notes

References

Additional sources

External sources
 
  

1950 births
Living people
People from Batley
Comillas Pontifical University alumni
21st-century Roman Catholic bishops in England
Pontifical Gregorian University alumni
Officials of the Roman Curia
People associated with Leeds Trinity University
Roman Catholic bishops of Leeds
English cardinals
Cardinals created by Pope Francis